Colton is a village and former civil parish,  west of Norwich, now in the parish of Marlingford and Colton, in the South Norfolk district, in the county of Norfolk, England. In 1931 the parish had a population of 175.

History
Colton's name is of Anglo-Saxon origin and derives from the Old English for Cola's farmstead or settlement.

Colton was recorded in the Domesday Book as Coletuna, it is recorded as a settlement of 2 households in the hundred of Forehoe. The village was part of the estate of William de Warenne.

On 1 April 1935 the parish was abolished and merged with Marlingford. In 2001 the new parish was renamed to "Marlingford and Colton".

The Norfolk Lurcher on High House Farm Lane which first opened in 1991 and was called the Ugly Bug Inn until 2007.

Geography
Colton falls within the constituency of South Norfolk and is represented at Parliament by Richard Bacon MP of the Conservative Party.

St. Andrew's Church
Colton's parish church is of Norman origin and is dedicated to Saint Andrew.

War Memorial
Colton's war memorials take the form of two plaques located inside St. Andrew's Church. The memorial lists the following names for the First World War:
 Private Daniel A. Shingles (d.1918), 5th Battalion, Duke of Wellington's Regiment
 Private Edward H. Loveday (d.1916), 8th Battalion, Royal Fusiliers
 Private George I. Fenn (d.1916), 11th Battalion, Royal Sussex Regiment
 Herbert Brown
 Frederick Davey
 Reginald Stone

And, the following for the Second World War:
 Gunner Sidney Curtis (d.1945), 57th (Light) Anti-Aircraft Regiment, Royal Artillery
 Marine Graham G. Dunnell (1922-1941), att. HMS Hood

St. Andrew's also holds a memorial to Peter Dunnell who was killed after his Avro Lincoln was shot down by the Soviet Air Force over Occupied Germany in 1953.

References

External links

 

Villages in Norfolk
Former civil parishes in Norfolk
South Norfolk